This is a list of lost silent films that were released from 1915 to 1919.

References 

Silent, 1915-19
History of film
1910s in film
Lists of 1910s films
1915-related lists
1916-related lists
1917-related lists
1918-related lists
1919-related lists
1915 in film
1916 in film
1917 in film
1918 in film
1919 in film